The Uprising of Santa Cruz de Mudela was a popular uprising that took place on 5 June 1808, at the beginning of the Spanish War of Independence, in the town of Santa Cruz de Mudela, Ciudad Real, Castile-La Mancha. Santa Cruz de Mudela is on the main road from Madrid to Andalusia.

A detachment of 400 French troops stationed in the village of Santa Cruz de Mudela were attacked by the population. 109 French soldiers were killed and 113 taken prisoner, while the rest fled back in the direction of Madrid, to Valdepeñas, where, the next day, there would be another famous popular uprising against the French Army.
 
The guerrilla actions at Santa Cruz and Valdepeñas, together with more isolated actions in the Sierra Morena itself, effectively cut French military communications between Madrid and Andalusia for around a month.

See also
Chronology of events of the Peninsular War

References

Battles of the Peninsular War
Wars of independence
Battles involving France
Battles involving Spain
Protests in Spain
1808 in Spain
May events
June 1808 events